John D. Joyner, also known by the nickname of "JJ", is an English former professional rugby league footballer who played in the 1970s, 1980s and 1990s, and coached in the 1990s.

Background
Joyner was born in Leeds, West Riding of Yorkshire, England.

Playing career

International honours
John Joyner won caps for England while at Castleford in 1980 against Wales, and France, in 1981 against France, and Wales, and won caps for Great Britain while at Castleford in 1978 against Australia (2 matches), in 1979 against Australia (3 matches), and New Zealand (3 matches), in 1980 against New Zealand (3 matches), in 1983 against France (2 matches), and in 1984 against France, and New Zealand (sub) (3 matches).

In addition to the above Test Matches, John Joyner played right- in Great Britain's 7-8 defeat by France in the friendly at Stadio Pier Luigi Penzo, Venice on Saturday 31 July 1982.

County honours

Challenge Cup Final appearances
John Joyner played  and was captain in Castleford's 15-14 victory over Hull Kingston Rovers in the 1985–86 Challenge Cup Final during the 1985–86 season at Wembley Stadium, London on Saturday 3 May 1986.

County Cup Final appearances
John Joyner played right- in Castleford's 17-7 victory over Featherstone Rovers in the 1977–78 Yorkshire Cup Final during the 1977–78 season at Headingley, Leeds on Saturday 15 October 1977, played , and scored a try in the 10-5 victory over Bradford Northern in the 1981–82 Yorkshire Cup Final during the 1981–82 season at Headingley, Leeds on Saturday 3 October 1981, played  in the 2-13 defeat by Hull F.C. in the 1983–84 Yorkshire Cup Final during the 1983–84 season at Elland Road, Leeds on Saturday 15 October 1983, played  in the 31-24 victory over Hull F.C. in the 1986–87 Yorkshire Cup Final during the 1986–87 season at Headingley, Leeds on Saturday 11 October 1986, played  in the 12-12 draw with Bradford Northern in the 1987–88 Yorkshire Cup Final during the 1987–88 season at Headingley, Leeds on Saturday 17 October 1987, played  in the 2-11 defeat by Bradford Northern in the 1987–88 Yorkshire Cup Final replay during the 1987–88 season at Elland Road, Leeds on Saturday 31 October 1987, and played , and scored a try in the 12-33 defeat by Leeds in the 1988–89 Yorkshire Cup Final during the 1988–89 season at Elland Road, Leeds on Sunday 16 October 1988.

BBC2 Floodlit Trophy Final appearances
John Joyner played right- in Castleford's 12-4 victory over Leigh in the 1976 BBC2 Floodlit Trophy Final during the 1976–77 season at Hilton Park, Leigh on Tuesday 14 December 1976.

Player's No.6 Trophy Final appearances
John Joyner played right- and scored  a try in Castleford's 25-15 victory over Blackpool Borough in the 1976–77 Player's No.6 Trophy Final during the 1976–77 season at The Willows, Salford on Saturday 22 January 1977.

Testimonial match
John Joyner's Testimonial match at Castleford took place in 1992.

Career records
Castleford's most tries scored in a match record is 5-tries, and is jointly held by; Derek Foster against Hunslet on 10 November 1972, John Joyner against Millom on 16 September 1973, Stephen Fenton against Dewsbury on 27 January 1978, Ian French against Hunslet on 9 February 1986, and St. John Ellis against Whitehaven on 10 December 1989.

Coaching career

Player's No.6 Trophy Final appearances
John Joyner was the coach in Castleford's 33-2 victory over Wigan in the 1993–94 Regal Trophy Final during the 1993-94 season at Headingley, Leeds on Saturday 22 January 1994.

Club career
John Joyner was the coach of Castleford, his first game in charge was on 27 August 1993, and his last game in charge was on 1 April 1997.

Honoured at Castleford Tigers
John Joyner is a Tigers Hall Of Fame Inductee.

References

External links
(archived by web.archive.org) Début of a Tiger legend
Photograph "Second Test Match" at rlhp.co.uk

1955 births
Living people
Castleford Tigers captains
Castleford Tigers coaches
Castleford Tigers players
England national rugby league team players
English rugby league coaches
English rugby league players
Great Britain national rugby league team players
Rugby league players from Leeds
Rugby league centres
Rugby league five-eighths
Rugby league locks
Yorkshire rugby league team players